Azospirillum oryzae is a species of nitrogen-fixing bacteria associated with the roots of Oryza sativa. Its type strain is COC8T (=IAM 15130T =CCTCC AB204051T).

References

Further reading

Kim, Chungwoo, et al. "Wheat root colonization and nitrogenase activity by Azospirillum isolates from crop plants in Korea." Canadian Journal of Microbiology 51.11 (2005): 948–956.
Elmerich, Claudine, and William Edward Newton, eds. Associative and endophytic nitrogen-fixing bacteria and cyanobacterial associations. Vol. 5. Springer, 2007.

External links

LPSN
Type strain of Azospirillum oryzae at BacDive -  the Bacterial Diversity Metadatabase

Rhodospirillales
Bacteria described in 2005